Archaeopteryx is an interactive computer software program, written in Java, for viewing, editing, and analyzing phylogenetic trees. This type of program can be used for a variety of analyses of molecular data sets, but is particularly designed for phylogenomics.   
Besides tree description formats with limited expressiveness (such as Newick/New Hamphshire, Nexus), it also implements the phyloXML format.
Archaeopteryx is the successor to Java program A Tree Viewer (ATV).

References

External links
phyloXML 
List of phylogeny software, hosted at the University of Washington 
Archaeopteryx

Phylogenetics software